Saya-e-Dewar Bhi Nahi (lit Not Even a Shadow of a Wall) was a Pakistani drama serial that began to air on Hum TV on 10 August 2016 succeeding Dil-e-Beqarar. It is directed by Shehzad Kashmiri and written by Qaisara Hayat based on her novel of same name. It stars Ahsan Khan and Naveen Waqar in main roles.

Plot
The story is about a girl named Shehla (Naveen Waqar) as the female protagonist, who was adopted as an infant by Syed Shahab Shah (Syed Jamal Shah). Since her father was a Syed he was chief of his tribe and a much honorable man. Shehla was brought up and pampered a lot in his mansion. Shehla grew older and was unknown to fact that she was adopted. She fell in love with Haider (Ahsan Khan), her cousin and Shahab's nephew and both wanted to marry each other. But according to Syed family law a Syed man must marry a Syed woman and since Shehla was adopted, she was not a Syed girl. Shehla got to know about herself and felt so hurt and started doubting her own identity. She became depressed at the fact that her family is not her own one. Shahab marries Shehla with one of his friend Mairaj Malik (Irfan Khoosat)'s son, Malik Mansoor (Emmad Irfani). Heartbroken at this, Haider marries Tahira (his cousin). Mansoor and his father were corrupt politicians and Mansoor was a psychopath. After he discovered the news about Shehla and Haider, his character turns out to be brutal towards Shehla, by beating her daily to bloodshed. Mansoor was in love with his mistress Shiza (Ghana Ali). Shehla got pregnant and gave birth to a daughter and she named her Shafaq. When Shafaq was born, Mansoor also won the local elections and became a minister, leading him to believe that Shafaq is a lucky women for him. Later on, Mansoor turns out to be a good father but a worst husband. Haider and his wife also had a daughter but his wife Tahira (Sharmeen Ali) died after childbirth. Before she dies for the sake of Haider's happiness, she requests for her daughter to be named Shehla. After ten years Shehla was shown as a mother of three children, while Mansoor was the same who used to abuse his wife. Shela escapes the marriage from Mansoor, leaving her three children:Shafaq (Noor Zafar Khan), Afaaq (Bilal Abbas), Falaq with Mansoor and his parents, of which the youngest daughter Falaq dies whilst left in the care of her siblings, who accidentally overdose her on medication whilst trying to treat her fever.

Shelha moves to a different city and marries a Christian, called Peter. She later gets pregnant with their child, and discovers Peter does not want children and asks her to abort the pregnancy. Shehla refuses to do this and they divorce and she moves out. Later the drama is fast forwarded 15–18 years, and all the children are shown as grown up, with Shelha working as a teacher, Shelha has not taught her son William (Ali Ansari) about religion and what he should believe in. He contemplates joining the Christian Missionary, to which his mother realises that she may not have raised him in a way conducive to Pakistani life. A chance meeting with the now grown up Shelha (Syed Zahra Shah) (Haider's daughter) leads to a meeting with Haider himself. In these days, orphan politician and where hyperman. Haider meets his old love Shehla in Shehla (Jr.)'s college. Soon after Shehla listens that Haider loves Shehla, she starts hating him which starts conflict with her father. In these days, she is supposed to marry Amber's son Asad Ali. Tabbassum is happy by their new meeting but Haider's daughter becomes angry very much that her father gives extra respect to Shehla. She warns Shehla to not meet Haider from which she fells down and is diagnosed by brain tumor. Where Shehla (Jr.) and Haider's relation becomes strained as she was cause of Shehla's condition but she did possible things (apologize from Shehla) from which Haider apologizes her. While Haider gives shelter to Shafaq, as she is difficulty because her father had an assassination attempt on her but she recovered. Afaaq thinks that Shafaq is dead, he blames on his father for killing Shafaq. At that time, Afaaq had married his servant, Rani, whose name is later changed into Seher by Afaaq himself. While, Mansoor says Shiza toe of sandals, on which their relation becomes strained and she goes in her home but someone attaches bomb in her car so that it gets blast in front of Shiza but she is at that time not sitting there. She again warns Mansoor that she will kill him on which he asks that what has he done.

Cast 
 Naveen Waqar as Shehla(Sr.)
 Ahsan Khan as Haider 
 Emmad Irfani as Malik Mansoor
 Ghana Ali as Shiza 
 Noor Zafar Khan as Shafaq 
 Bilal Abbas as Afaaq 
 Ali Ansari as William 
 Naima Khan as Zubaida
 Jamal Shah as Shahab Shah (dead)
 Irfan Khoosat as Malik Mairaj (dead)
 Shamayel Tareen as Tabassum
 Sonia Khan as Zara (dead)
 Shermeen Ali as Tahira (dead)
 Nimra Khan as Seher/Rani 
 Hina Altaf as Aainoor
 Zahra Shah as Shehla (Jr.)  
 Naeema Khan as Malik Mansoor's mother (dead)
 Faseeh Sardar as Sohail
 Rana Tahir
 Rashida Tabassum 
 Saima Kanwal
 Sajeeruddin as Johnson 
 Habib Asadi

Child stars 
 Eshal as Shafaq

Production

In an interview Ahsan said, "the drama is not based love story of a boy and a girl rather it has religious message beautifully embed into it,".

See also 
 List of programs broadcast by Hum TV

References

External links 
 

Hum TV original programming
Pakistani drama television series
Pakistani telenovelas
Serial drama television series
MD Productions
Television series by MD Productions
Television series created by Momina Duraid
Pakistani television dramas based on novels
Urdu-language television shows
2016 Pakistani television series debuts
2017 Pakistani television series endings